Pritam Das (born 16th October 1988) is an Indian cricketer who plays for Assam in domestic cricket.

Das is a right-arm fast-medium bowler, born in Silchar, Assam. He made his first-class debut during the 2006-07 Ranji Trophy competition, against Odisha in January 2007. He took 5 for 65 in the first innings.

The following month, Das made List A debut in the Vijay Hazare Trophy match against Orissa. In April 2007, he made appearances for Assam in the Inter State Twenty20 tournament. He also represented the Royal Bengal Tigers in now defunct Twenty 20 league ICL. He took most wickets in the 2012–13 Vijay Hazare Trophy, India's domestic 50 over tournament.

In 2019–20 as well, he was the joint-leading wicket-taker in the Vijay Hazare Trophy tournament, with twenty-three dismissals in nine matches.

References

External links
Pritam Das at ESPNcricinfo
Pritam Das at CricketArchive 

1988 births
Living people
Indian cricketers
Assam cricketers
People from Silchar
ICL India XI cricketers
Royal Bengal Tigers cricketers
Cricketers from Assam